The Divine Comedy has been a source of inspiration for artists, musicians, and authors since its appearance in the late 13th and early 14th centuries. Works are included here if they have been described by scholars as relating substantially in their structure or content to the Divine Comedy.

The Divine Comedy is an Italian narrative poem by Dante Alighieri, begun  1308 and completed in 1320, a year before his death in 1321. Divided into three parts: Inferno (Hell), Purgatorio (Purgatory), and Paradiso (Heaven), it is widely considered the pre-eminent work in Italian literature and one of the greatest works of world literature. The poem's imaginative vision of the afterlife is representative of the medieval worldview as it had developed in the Catholic Church by the 14th century. It helped to establish the Tuscan language, in which it is written, as the standardized Italian language.

Literature

Medieval 

 In 1373, a little more than half a century after Dante's death, the Florentine authorities softened their attitude to him and decided to establish a department for the study of the Divine Comedy. Giovanni Boccaccio (1313–1375) was appointed to head the department in October 1373, and he sponsored its organization. In January 1374, Boccaccio wrote and delivered a series of lectures on the Comedy. In addition, Boccaccio is included in the work Origine, vita e costumi di Dante Alighieri, where his treatise Trattatello in laude di Dante provides a biography of Dante.
 Geoffrey Chaucer (c. 1343–1400) translated, adapted, and explicitly referred to Dante's work.
 "A Complaynt to His Lady," an early short poem, is written in terza rima, the rhyme scheme Dante invented for the Comedy.
 Anelida and Arcite ends with a "" by Anelida, the lover jilted by Arcite; the  begins with the phrase "So thirleth with the poynt of remembraunce" and ends with "Hath thirled with the poynt of remembraunce," copied from Purgatory 12.32, "la punctura di la rimembranza."
 The House of Fame, a dream vision in three books in which the narrator is guided through the heavens by an otherworldly guide, has been described as a parody of the Comedy. The narrator echoes Inferno 2.32 in the poem (2.588–592).
 The Monk's Tale from The Canterbury Tales describes (in greater and more emphatic detail) the plight of Count Ugolino (Inferno, cantos 32 and 33), referring explicitly to Dante's original text in 7.2459–2462.
 The beginning of the last stanza of Troilus and Criseyde (5.1863-65) is modelled on Paradiso 12.28–30.

Early Modern 

 John Milton finds various uses for Dante, whose work he knew well:
 Milton refers to Dante's insistence on the separation of worldly and religious power in Of Reformation, where he cites Inferno 19.115–117.
 Beatrice's condemnation of corrupt and neglectful preachers, Paradiso 29.107–109 ("so that the wretched sheep, in ignorance, / return from pasture, having fed on wind") is translated and adapted in Lycidas 125–126, "The hungry Sheep look up, and are not fed, / But swoln with wind, and the rank mist they draw," when Milton condemns corrupt clergy.

Nineteenth century 

 The title of Honoré de Balzac's work La Comédie humaine (the "Human Comedy," 1815–1848) is usually considered a conscious adaptation of Dante's.
 Henry Wadsworth Longfellow, who translated the Divine Comedy into English, wrote a poem titled "Mezzo Cammin" ("Halfway," 1845), alluding to the first line of the Comedy, and a sonnet sequence (of six sonnets) under the title "Divina Commedia" (1867); these were published as flyleaves to his translation.
 Karl Marx uses a paraphrase of Purgatory (V, 13) to conclude the preface to the first edition of Das Kapital (1867), as a kind of motto: "Segui il tuo corso, e lascia dir le genti" ("follow your own road, and let the people talk").
 Lesya Ukrainka's poem "The Forgotten Shadow" (1898) is a feminist reinterpretation of Dante and Beatrice. The forgotten shadow in the poem is Gemma Donati, Aligheri's wife.

Twentieth century 

 In E. M. Forster's novel Where Angels Fear to Tread (1905), the character of Gino Carella, upon first introducing himself, quotes the first lines of Inferno (the novel includes several references to Dante's La Vita Nuova as well).
 T. S. Eliot cites Inferno, XXVII, 61–66, as an epigraph to "The Love Song of J. Alfred Prufrock" (1915). Eliot cites heavily from and alludes to Dante in Prufrock and Other Observations (1917), Ara vus prec (1920), and The Waste Land (1922).
 Begun in 1916, Ezra Pound's Cantos take the Comedy as a model.
 Samuel Beckett in his non-fiction essay "Dante... Bruno. Vico.. Joyce", published in Our Exagmination Round His Factification for Incamination of Work in Progress (1929), compares Joyce's reassessments of the conventions of the English language to Dante's departure from Latin and synthesis of Italian dialects in the Divine Comedy.
 Turkish poet Cahit Sıtkı Tarancı's famous poem "Otuz Beş Yaş" (lit. "Thirty Five Years") is beginning with the verses which contains a citation of Inferno: "Yaş otuz beş! Yolun yarısı eder / Dante gibi ortasındayız ömrün" ("Age thirty five! It is half of way / We are in the middle of life like Dante") won the Best Turkish Poem Prize in 1946.
 Primo Levi cites Dante's Divine Comedy in the chapter called "Canto of Ulysses" in his novel Se questo è un uomo (If This Is a Man) (1947), published in the United States as Survival in Auschwitz, and in other parts of this book; the fires of Hell are compared to the "real threat of the fires of the crematorium."
 Malcolm Lowry paralleled Dante's descent into hell with Geoffrey Firmin's descent into alcoholism in his epic novel Under the Volcano (1947). In contrast to the original, Lowry's character explicitly refuses grace and "chooses hell," though Firmin does have a Dr. Vigil as a guide (and his brother, Hugh Firmin, quotes the Comedy from memory in ch. 6).
 Aleksandr Solzhenitsyn's novel The First Circle (1968) takes its title from the Inferno. Set in a special Gulag for scientists, it parallels Dante's First Circle (Limbo) where virtuous philosophers of antiquity are separated from God and humanity but not punished in any other way. 
 The seventh and last chapter from Leopoldo Marechal's first novel, Adam Buenosayres, is a parody of the Inferno, entitled "Journey To The Dark City Of Cacodelphia", wherein the titular character meets several of his literary contemporaries (including his guide).* Jorge Luis Borges, who wrote extensively about Dante, included two short texts in his Dreamtigers (El Hacedor, 1960): "Paradiso, XXXI, 108" and "Inferno, I, 32," which paraphrase and comment on Dante's lines.
 Poet Derek Walcott, in 1949, published Epitaph for the Young: XII Cantos, which he later acknowledged as influenced by Dante.
 James Merrill published his Divine Comedies, a collection of poetry, in 1976; a selection in that volume, "The Book of Ephraim", consists "of conversations held, via the Ouija board, with dead friends and spirits in 'another world.'"
 Authors Larry Niven and Jerry Pournelle wrote a modern sequel to the Inferno, Inferno (1976), in which a science fiction author dies during a fan convention and finds himself in Hell, where Benito Mussolini functions as his guide. They wrote a subsequent sequel to their own work, Escape from Hell (2009).
 Gloria Naylor's Linden Hills (1985) uses Dante's Inferno as a model for the trek made by two young black poets who spend the days before Christmas doing odd jobs in an affluent African American community. The young men soon discover the price paid by the inhabitants of Linden Hills for pursuing the American dream.
 Author Monique Wittig's Virgile, Non (published in English as Across the Acheron, 1985) is a lesbian–feminist parody of the Divine Comedy set in the utopia/dystopia of second-wave feminism.
 Mark E. Rogers used the structure of Dante's hell in his 1998 comedic novel Samurai Cat Goes to Hell (the last in the Samurai Cat series), and includes the trope of a gate to hell with an "abandon hope" inscription.

Twenty-first century 

 Irish poet Seamus Heaney published a poem, "A Dream of Solstice", on the front page of the Irish Times (18 January 2000) that begins with a translation of Paradiso 33.58–61 as "Like somebody who sees things when he's dreaming / And after the dream lives with the aftermath / Of what he felt, no other trace remaining, / So I live now".

 Nick Tosches's In The Hand of Dante (2002) weaves a contemporary tale about the finding of an original manuscript of the Divine Comedy with an imagined account of Dante's years composing the work.
 Inferno by Peter Weiss (written in 1964, published in 2003) is a play inspired by the Comedy, the first part of a planned trilogy.
 The Dante Club is a 2003 novel by Matthew Pearl that tells the story of various American poets translating The Divine Comedy in post-civil war Boston, who must also investigate murders being committed based on the punishments in the text, due to their desire to protect Dante's reputation and the fact that only they have the necessary expertise to understand the murderer's motivations.
 Óscar Esquivias in his trilogy of novels Inquietud en el Paraíso (2005), La ciudad del Gran Rey (2006) and Viene la noche (2007) shows his personal vision of Dante's Divine Comedy.
 In the novel The Tenth Circle (2006) by Jodi Picoult, the main character's comic strip, The Tenth Circle, is based on the Inferno 
 Dante himself is a character in The Master of Verona (2007), a novel by David Blixt that combines the people of Dante's time with the characters of Shakespeare's Italian plays.
 S.A. Alenthony's novel The Infernova is a parody of the Inferno as seen from an atheist's perspective, with Mark Twain acting as the guide.

Visual arts

Sculpture 

 Auguste Rodin's sculptural group The Gates of Hell draws heavily on the Inferno. The component sculpture, Paolo and Francesca, represents Francesca da Rimini and Paolo Malatesta, whom Dante meets in Canto 5. The version of this sculpture known as The Kiss shows the book that Paolo and Francesca were reading. Other component sculptures include Ugolino and his children (Canto 33) and The Shades, who originally pointed to the phrase "Lasciate ogne speranza, voi ch'entrate" ("Abandon all hope, ye who enter here") from Canto 3. Sculptures of Grief and Despair cannot be assigned to particular sections of the Inferno, but are in keeping with the overall theme. The famous component sculpture The Thinker, near the top of the gate, and also produced as an independent work, may represent Dante himself.

Timothy Schmalz created a series of 100 sculptures, one for each canto, on the 700th anniversary of the date of Dante’s death.

Illustrations 

 Giovanni di Paolo illuminated Dante's Paradiso with 61 miniature tempera paintings in the 1440s.
 Sandro Botticelli made the most famous set of illustrations during the Renaissance for a manuscript of the Divine Comedy commissioned by Lorenzo Pierfrancesco de' Medici; Botticelli also designed a series of illustrations for the 1481 edition of the poem. 
 Stradanus prepared a series of illustrations of Inferno.
 A commentary by La Comedia di Dante Alighieri con la nova esposizione written by Alessandro Vellutello and printed in 1544 by Francesco Marcolini, was illustrated with 87 engravings, possibly by Giovanni Britto.
 John Flaxman's set of one hundred and eleven illustrations were influential across Europe on artists such as Goya and Ingres, because of their radically minimalist style.
 William Blake planned and executed several watercolour illustrations to the Divine Comedy, including The Wood of the Self-Murderers: The Harpies and the Suicides. Though he did not finish the series before his death in 1827, they offer a powerful visual interpretation of the poem.
 Gustave Doré made the most famous illustrations in the 19th century; the plates were drawn in 1857, and published in 1860 with Henry Francis Cary's translation.
 Franz von Bayros illustrated a 1921 edition in colour.
 Salvador Dalí made a series of prints for the Comedy in 1950–51.
 British artist Tom Phillips illustrated his own translation of the Inferno, published in 1985, with four illustrations per canto.

Painting 

 Eugène Delacroix made his name with The Barque of Dante (1822), a painting depicting Dante and Virgil crossing the river Styx.
 Joseph Anton Koch illustrated Dante's Divine Comedy and in the period 1824–1829 painted the four frescoes in the Dante Room of Casa Massimo.
 William-Adolphe Bouguereau, the prolific 19th-century academic artist, painted Dante And Virgil In Hell in 1850. 
 Dante Gabriel Rossetti, a Pre-Raphaelite, made several paintings of the Divine Comedy, including Dante's Vision of Rachel and Leah (1855, for Purgatorio XXVII), his largest painting Dante's Dream at the Time of the Death of Beatrice (1871), and Beata Beatrix (1872).
 Henry Holiday is best known for his 1884 painting Dante and Beatrice.
 Graba' made a cycle La Divina Commedia consisting of 111 paintings in 2003 exhibited in the Art Hall Sint-Pietersabdij in Ghent.

 Architecture 

 The Danteum is an unbuilt monument designed by the Italian modernist architect Giuseppe Terragni at the behest of Benito Mussolini's fascist dictatorship.
 The Palacio Barolo in Buenos Aires, completed in 1923, was designed in accordance with the cosmology of Dante's Divine Comedy, motivated by Italian architect Mario Palanti's admiration for Dante.

 Performing arts 

 Dance 

 In 2021, the Royal Opera House put on The Dante Project, choreographed by Wayne McGregor to new music composed and conducted by Thomas Adès, with set and costumes by Tacita Dean. It was danced by The Royal Ballet, led by its principal dancer Edward Watson as Dante, in his final appearance after 20 years working with and interpreting McGregor. The music was performed live by an orchestra of 75 musicians. Sarah Crompton called the work "bold, beautiful, emotional and utterly engaging". The dance is in three sections. "Inferno" shows Dante's journey to hell, guided by Virgil, in "remarkably free and inventive" choreography, "rich in feeling". "Purgatorio" shows Dante meeting two incarnations of his young self, and three of the woman he loves, Beatrice. Watson dances with the living Beatrice (Francesca Hayward) "in lovely, poetic flow", and then with the heavenly Beatrice (Sarah Lamb) "all unfolding limbs and ethereal gestures". "Paradiso" has Dante in heaven with the dancers skittering about the stage all in white, in what Crompton calls a mood "of abstracted joy, deep but dazzling".

 Opera 

 In Claudio Monteverdi's 1607 opera L'Orfeo, the title character is bombarded with the famous line "Lasciate ogni speranza voi ch'entrate" as he attempts to enter the underworld.

Numerous mainly 19th century operas treat the story of Francesca da Rimini, many of them including those by Pellico (1818), Strepponi (1823), Carlini, Mercadante, Quilici, Generali, Staffa, Manna, Fournier, Tamburini, Borgatta, Morlacchi, Papparlardo, Nordal, Maglioni, Bellini, DeVasinis, Meiners (1841), Cannetti, Brancaccio, Rolland, Ruggieri, Pinelli, Franchini, Meiners (again, this time in 1860), Gilson, Sescewich, Boullard, Marcarini, Moscuzza, Goetz, Cagnoni, Thomas, Impallomeni, Gilson, Nápravník, Rachmaninov (in 1906), Leoni, Zandonai (1914, based on the 1901 play by Gabriele D'Annunzio), and Henried (in 1920) all having that same title.

 Classical music 

By 1995, the Divine Comedy had been set to music over 120 times; Gioacchino Rossini created two such settings. Only 8 of the settings are of the complete Commedia, "the most famous" being Liszt's symphony; others have composed music for some of Dante's characters, while yet others have set passages of the Commedia to music. 

 Franz Liszt's Symphony to Dante's Divina Commedia (completed 1856) has two movements: "Inferno" and "Purgatorio." A concluding "Magnificat" is included at the end of the "Purgatorio" movement and replaces the planned third movement, which was to be called "Paradiso" (Liszt was dissuaded by Richard Wagner from his original plan). Liszt also composed a Dante Sonata (started 1837, completed 1849).
 Pyotr Ilich Tchaikovsky's 1876 Francesca da Rimini (subtitled "Symphonic Fantasy After Dante") is a symphonic poem based on an episode in the fifth canto of the Inferno.
 Henry Barraud's cantata for five voices and 15 instruments, La divine comédie, based on Dante's text, was composed in 1972.

 Dutch composer Louis Andriessen's 2008 film opera in five parts La Commedia incorporates texts from Vondel and the Old Testament, in addition to The Divine Comedy. The five parts are "The City of Dis, or The Ship of Fools", "Racconto dall'Inferno", "Lucifer", "The Garden of Delights", and "Luce Etterna". 
 Laudi alla Vergine Maria is Movement 3, for women's voices, of Giuseppe Verdi's Quattro Pezzi Sacri (Four Sacred Pieces, 1888). The text is from the opening lines of Canto 33 of Paradiso.

 Popular music 

 F. M. Einheit of Einstürzende Neubauten and Andreas Ammer collaborated on an experimental recording called Radio Inferno, a radio play adaptation of the Comedy.
 On his 1992 album Façanhas, Brazilian musician Arrigo Barnabé set the first 48 lines of the Inferno (translated to Portuguese by the famous poet Augusto de Campos) to music.
 Tangerine Dream has released albums setting all the three parts of The Divine Comedy to music: Inferno is a recording of a live performance at the St Marien zu Bernau Cathedral in 2001, and Purgatorio and Paradiso are studio albums from 2004 and 2006 respectively. 
 German Dark Electro band yelworC has made two albums of a trilogy based on the three canticas of the Divine Comedy, Trinity and Icolation.
 Australian goth-electro band the Tenth Stage has a self-titled track (2006) that describes the singer's descent past the nine stages of Dante's poem to a 10th stage of Hell.
 Technical death metal guitarist Fredrik Thordendal (from the Swedish Death metal band Meshuggah) used quotes from the Divine Comedy in the song "Dante's Wild Inferno" from his solo album Sol Niger Within.
 The song "Canto IV (Limbo)" from Progressive music group Discipline's album Unfolded Like Staircase describes the sorrow of those souls who never knew a deity.
 Italian progressive rock band Metamorfosi has released two concept albums based on the Divine Comedy, Inferno (in 1972) and Paradiso (2004).
 Metal band Iced Earth's album Burnt Offerings (1995) contains the epic song "Dante's Inferno", over 16 minutes long.
 Zao refer to the Divine Comedy on their 1999 album Liberate Te Ex Inferis, covering the first five circles of the Inferno.
 Punk singer Mike Watt's third solo album, The Secondman's Middle Stand (2004), is a concept album that derives its structure from The Divine Comedy.
 Thrash metal band Sepultura's tenth album, Dante XXI (2006), is based on The Divine Comedy.
 Professor Fate's album Inferno (2007) was inspired by the Comedy.
 The Finnish progressive rock magazine Colossus and Musea Records produced three multi-disc boxsets dedicated to each of the canticas of the Divine Comedy – Inferno (2008), Purgatorio (2009) and Paradiso (2010) – with the participation of several bands such as Yesterdays, Little Tragedies, Nathan Mahl and Phideaux.
 Austrian gothic metal band Dreams of Sanity's album Komödia is partially based on The Divine Comedy.
 American post-hardcore band Alesana's fourth album, A Place Where the Sun Is Silent, is primarily based on the Inferno.
 Mexican death metal band Transmetal released El Infierno de Dante in 1993. The English version, Dante's Inferno, was released in 1994.
 British rapper and saxophonist Soweto Kinch's album The Legend of Mike Smith is based on the Inferno, and includes songs named for the nine circles of hell.
American progressive metal band Symphony X's 2015 album Underworld is based on the Inferno.

 Radio 

 Inferno Revisited, a modernised interpretation of Dante written by Peter Howell, was first broadcast on BBC Radio 4 on 17 April 1983.
 Between March and April 2014, the BBC adapted The Divine Comedy for Radio 4, starring Blake Ritson and John Hurt playing younger and older versions of Dante.

 Film 

 The 1911 silent film L'Inferno was directed by Giuseppe de Liguoro, starring Salvatore Papa. It was released on DVD in 2004, with a soundtrack by Tangerine Dream.
 The 1924 silent film Dante's Inferno, directed by Henry Otto, features the 1911 film, L'Inferno; the section on the inferno is reduced to a ten-minute segment.
 The 1935 motion picture Dante's Inferno, directed by Harry Lachman, written by Philip Klein and starring Spencer Tracy, is about a fairground attraction based on Inferno. The film features a 10-minute fantasy sequence visualizing Dante's Inferno.
  The 1975 Pier Paolo Pasolini film Salò, or the 120 Days of Sodom is set in four segments inspired by Dante's Divine Comedy: the Anteinferno, the Circle of Manias, the Circle of Shit and the Circle of Blood.
 Stan Brakhage's eight-minute hand-painted film, The Dante Quartet (1987), is inspired by the Divine Comedy.
 Peter Greenaway adapted Cantos I to VIII for BBC Two as A TV Dante (1987–1990).
 Krzysztof Kieślowski planned to create a new trilogy inspired by Dante's The Divine Comedy after finishing The Three Colors Trilogy (1993–1994). This intention, however, was abandoned after his death in 1996 until Tom Tykwer decided to shoot the film Heaven in 2002, using Kieslowski's original screenplay. In 2005, Bosnian director Danis Tanović directed Hell based on Kieslowski's screenplay sketches. The screenplay was completed by Krzysztof Piesiewicz, Kieslowski's screenwriter.
 The motion picture Se7en (1995) stars Brad Pitt and Morgan Freeman as two detectives who investigate a series of ritualistic murders inspired by the seven deadly sins. The film makes many references to Dante's Divine Comedy.
 Ridley Scott's 2001 film Hannibal has Hannibal Lecter as a medievalist lecturing on Dante's Divine Comedy, and to some extent echoing the work in his murderous methods.
 Jean-Luc Godard's 2004 film Notre musique is structured in three parts, Hell, Purgatory, and Paradise respectively, alluding to the Divine Comedy.
 The film Dante's Inferno (2007) is based on Sandow Birk's contemporary drawings of the Divine Comedy. The film accurately retells the original story, but with the addition of more recent residents of Hell such as Adolf Hitler and Boss Tweed.
 The 2014 film "As Above So Below" directed by John Erick Dowdle, is based on Dante Alighieri's Inferno. It is presented as found footage of a documentary crew's experience exploring the Catacombs of Paris and draws inspiration of the nine layers of Hell. 
 The 2015 Chinese documentary Behemoth (Chinese: 悲兮魔兽; pinyin: bēixī móshòu), directed by Zhao Liang, is loosely based on Dante Alighieri's Divine Comedy and is about the environmental, sociological, and public health effects of coal-mining in China and Inner Mongolia.
 The 2016 mystery thriller Inferno makes many references to The Divine Comedy and to the Divine Comedy Illustrated by Botticelli including hiding a word puzzle in a version of the painting Map of Hell with the levels of Hell rearranged. There's a clue in an email that refers to a passage from Paradiso and the virus that serves as the catalyst for the film's plot is named "Inferno."
 The 2018 film The House That Jack Built features Matt Dillon as protagonist Jack, a serial killer who believes that his murders are a piece of art, similarly to the Divine Comedy, and encounters Virgil as a hallucination portrayed by Bruno Ganz, who is well known for his role in Downfall as Adolf Hitler, while Jack, after a lengthy conversation with Vergil through the entirety of the film where he expressed his ambitions of becoming an architect despite being an engineer that mirrored Romney's and Hitler's political careers despite their backgrounds as businessman and painter, respectively, ends up wearing the red robe of Dante Alighieri while unsuccessfully attempting to escape Inferno after rejecting Vergil's advice to follow him in the Purgatorio since it is the only safe way to reach the desired destination of Paradiso.
 The 2020 film Friend of the World references The Divine Comedy and begins with a direct quote by Dante Alighieri.

 Television 

 The 2005 4th season of the BBC drama series Messiah: The Harrowing focuses on a serial killer who takes inspiration from Inferno to punish his or her victims.
 In the tenth season of Criminal Minds, the case in the second episode, "Burn", tracks the actions of a serial killer whose crimes are inspired by the punishment in each circle of Hell.
 The Good Place follows an analogous pattern in its main plot, with its characters ascending from hell, through struggles on earth, and into paradise over the course of the show.

 Graphic media 

 Animations, comics and graphic novels 

 Dave Sim's sequel series to his comic Cerebus, Cerebus in Hell, satirically utilizes Gustave Doré's engravings for the Divine Comedy as backgrounds and plot devices.
 In the manga series Cesare (2005) by Fuyumi Soryo the Divine Comedy and the friendship between Alighieri and Henry VII, Holy Roman Emperor, is discussed at length.
 The short animation, Dante's Hell Animated (2014), featuring Eric Roberts as Dante, is based on Dino di Durante's original paintings of Dante's Inferno.
 Dante's Inferno: The Graphic Novel (2012) by Joseph Lanzara utilizes the 1857 illustrations by Gustave Doré from the Divine Comedy in the form of a comic book inspired by the poem.
 The main antagonists of the manga Fullmetal Alchemist and anime Fullmetal Alchemist: Brotherhood are seven homunculi, each named after one of the Seven Deadly Sins with the exception of Father. There were originally eight, but Greed defected due to his avarice. In addition, Lust is killed when Mustang incinerates her beyond her ability to regenerate using flame alchemy, a direct reference to Purgatorio.
 IDW Publishing's Godzilla in Hell miniseries has Godzilla finding himself in Hell after accidentally destroying the planet in a battle with SpaceGodzilla and rampaging his way through the levels of Hell to find a way out, destroying the "Abandon Hope All Ye Who Enter Here" sign with his atomic breath, battling demons and manifestations of familiar monsters representing various sins, and turning a version of the Mount of Purgatory made up of monster parts into a battlefield between the forces of Heaven and Hell that want to recruit Godzilla into their ranks.
 Jimbo in Purgatory: being a mis-recounting of Dante Alighieri's Divine Comedy in pictures and un-numbered footnotes, a 33-page graphic novel by Gary Panter, an adaptation of Dante's Purgatorio (melded with Boccaccio's Decameron and a bit of Canterbury Tales, John Milton, John Dryden, and pop culture references).
 DC/Vertigo Comics' Kid Eternity (which premiered in Hit Comics #25, published by Quality Comics in December 1942), in which Kid and his companion Jerry Sullivan travel to a Dante-inspired Hell to free a partner of Kid's. The structure of the comic also draws features from Dante's Inferno.
 Mickey's Inferno is a comic book adaptation written by Guido Martina and drawn by Angelo Bioletto featuring Disney characters including Mickey Mouse, Goofy and Donald Duck published by the then-Italian Disney comic book licensee Mondadori in the monthly Topolino from Oct. 1949 to March 1950. An English-language version appeared in Walt Disney's Comics and Stories #666 (March 2006).
 Manga series Saint Seiya (1986), during the "Hades Inferno" arc, has many characters and structures of Hell based on the circles of Dante, where they're called the Nine Prisons.
 Ty Templeton parodied Dante in his Stig's Inferno (1985-1986).
 Neil Gaiman's The Sandman comic series features a heavily Dante-inspired Hell, including the Wood of Suicides, the Malebolge, and the City of Dis; Lucifer is imprisoned in Hell. DC/Vertigo Comics's Lucifer, based on characters from The Sandman, features aspects of a Dante-inspired Hell and Heaven, particularly the Primum Mobile and the Nine Sections of Hell.
 The visual novel and anime series Umineko no Naku Koro ni contains several elements from the Divine Comedy, including two characters named Beatrice (as the Golden Witch), Virgilia (as the Endless Witch) and the Stakes (Seven Deadly Sins).
 The anime adaptation has an ending theme entitled La Divina Tragedia ~Makyoku~, named after the title La Divina Comedia. "Makyoku" is the opposite of "Shinkyoku", Divine Comedys Japanese title.
 The Cartoon Network's miniseries Over the Garden Wall corresponds to the structure of the Inferno; it stars a lost poet guided by a woman named Beatrice.
 The anime series Sin Nanatsu no Taizai incorporates elements from the Divine Comedy, including Cocytus (episode 1), the inscription on the gates (episode 9) and a reenactment of Dante's journey to the lowest level of Hell.
 In Animamundi: Dark Alchemist, the main character is guided through the nine circles of Hell towards the end of the game.
 The anime Revolutionary Girl Utena has a second ending theme song titled "Virtual Star Embryology" that has a stanza that lists the Spheres of Heaven from the third and final part of the Divine Comedy. It lists from the First Sphere: The Moon to the Ninth Sphere: The Primum Mobile.

 Video games 
 Beyond Software wrote Dante's Inferno in 1986 for the Commodore 64.
 Dante's Inferno is a 2010 action-adventure video game developed by Visceral Games and published by Electronic Arts for the Xbox 360 and PlayStation 3 consoles. The game was also developed by Artificial Mind and Movement for release on the PlayStation Portable. The story is loosely based on Dante's Inferno.
 Dante's Inferno: An Animated Epic is a direct-to-DVD animated film released on February 9, 2010. The film is a spin-off from the above video game.
 Dante's Inferno is a series of six comic books based on the above video game. Published by WildStorm from December 2009 through May 2010, the series was written by Christos Gage with art by Diego Latorre.
 In the game Devil May Cry (2001), the protagonist's name is Dante, his brother is Vergil, and Dante's partner-in-crime's name is Trish, a derivative of the name Beatrice. It uses the nine circles in its world structure, the seven deadly sins, and the parts of the Cocytus (Caina, Antenora and Judecca) in the names of enemies in the fifth game.
 Final Fantasy IV features four Elemental Lords named Rubicante, Scarmiglione, Barbariccia, and Cagnazzo, after members of the Malebranche. A mid-game boss, Calcabrina, also has the name of a Malebranche demon. Also, there exists a superboss in the DS version named Geryon.
 Halo 3: ODST contains many references to the poem. For example, the Rookie is called into Section Nine, which is very icy and cold, similar to the ninth ring of Hell. In addition, the player's guide through the end of the game is called Vergil. Further, there are characters in the game that correspond to each of the sins.
 In Persona 3 FES, areas are called Malebolge, Cocytus, Caina, Antenora, Ptolomea, Judecca, and Empyrean.
 The 2012 game Resident Evil: Revelations references Dante's Inferno extensively, as a bioterrorist organization, "Il Veltro", believes society has degraded into a living version of the nine circles. Verses of the poem are provided at the start of each level. A number of enemies in the game are named after the Malebranche also featured in the poem. The music in the final chapter has a choir eerily singing lines from Inferno, and the final boss actually quotes it before entering his chamber. Tamashii no Mon Dante no Shinkyoku yori (魂の門 ダンテ「神曲」より Gate of Souls ~ From Dante's Divine Comedy), a side-scrolling action-adventure game inspired by Dante's Divine Comedy released on PC-98 and FM Towns.
 The plot of Ultrakill revolves around machines descending through hell in order to take blood from the souls of the damned. The different layers are named after those seen in Inferno and many feature punishments similar to those seen in the poem.
 In Wild Arms 2, there is a gang called Cocytus, whose members are named Caina, Antenora, Ptolomea, and Judecca.
 Korean game studio Project Moon's game Limbus Company features a variety of characters based on classical literary figures and characters. Among these characters is Dante, the manager and main playable character of the game.

 Card games 

 The trading card game Yu-Gi-Oh! released a series of cards known as "Burning Abyss". All cards in the series are based on the eighth circle of Hell and the Malebranche, including Dante, Virgil, and Beatrice.

 Tabletop role-playing games 

Several aspects of the Divine comedy could have influenced some tabletop role-playing games : the visitation of other worlds, more specifically plane walking through them; a gamified economy of the salvation; and symbolism.

 The tabletop role-playing game Dungeons & Dragons named some levels of the Nine Hells after locations in Dante's Inferno. The game borrowed the name "malebranche" for one diabolical race, although the original write-up mistranslated that word as "evil horn".
 The Planescape setting, in particular, borrows many elements from the book (some wholesale, some piecemeal), and much of the expanded cosmology, with dimensions for the dead based on alignment and most dimensions having many separate layers, are inspired by those seen in the Inferno. The planecrawling gameplay of Planescape and early setting of D&D could be heavily inspired by the structured travel of Dante through the layers of the planes of the Divine Comedy.

Notes

External links
 700 Years of Dante's Divine Comedy in Art – documented image collection on The Public Domain Review
 DivineComedy.digital – a website cataloging 700 years of the Divine Comedy''

 
 
Literature in popular culture